Loncoche (Mapudungun for "head of an important person") is a city and commune in Cautín Province in the Araucanía Region, southern Chile. It is located near the border to Los Ríos Region and the city of Lanco. 

Loncoche is a major centre for milk production. Loncoleche is the main milk and dairy product producer in the zone.

Pablo Neruda wrote a poem called "Aromos rubios en los campos de Loncoche".

Demographics
Of these, 15,223 (66.1%) lived in urban areas and 7,814 (33.9%) in rural areas. The population fell by 2.6% (606 persons) between the 1992 and 2002 censuses.

Administration
As a commune, Loncoche is a third-level administrative division of Chile administered by a municipal council, headed by an alcalde who is directly elected every four years. The 2008-2012 alcalde is Ricardo Peña Riquelme (RN).

Within the electoral divisions of Chile, Loncoche is represented in the Chamber of Deputies by René Manuel García (RN) and Fernando Meza (PRSD) as part of the 52nd electoral district, together with Cunco, Pucón, Curarrehue, Villarrica, Gorbea and Toltén. The commune is represented in the Senate by José Garcia Ruminot (RN) and Eugenio Tuma Zedan (PPD) as part of the 15th senatorial constituency (Araucanía-South). There are two high schools - Liceo Bicentenario P. Alberto Hurtado Cruchaga and Santa Cruz.

References

External links
  Municipality of Loncoche

Communes of Chile
Populated places established in 1900
Populated places in Cautín Province
Mapuche language